Mark Leibovich (born May 9, 1965) is an American journalist and author. He is a staff writer at The Atlantic, and previously spent a decade as the chief national correspondent for The New York Times Magazine, based in Washington, D.C. He is known for his profiles of political and media figures. He also wrote the Times Magazine's "Your Fellow Americans" column about politics, media, and public life.

Early life and education 
Born in Boston, Massachusetts to a father who was from Argentina, Leibovich grew up in a home he describes as not religious. He now describes himself as a "reporter of (nominal) Jewish identity".

Leibovich attended Newton South High School, from which he graduated in 1983. He went on to attend the University of Michigan, graduating with a bachelor's degree in English in 1987.

Career
Leibovich got his start as a journalist writing for Boston's alternative weekly  The Phoenix, where he worked for four years. After that, he moved to California and worked as a reporter at The San Jose Mercury News.

Leibovich then moved to Washington, D.C. to work at The Washington Post, where he spent nine years, first covering the national technology sector for the Posts business section, then serving as the lead political writer for the paper's style section.

In 2006, Leibovich was hired by The New York Times, where he was a national political correspondent in the Times' Washington Bureau. He then became Chief National Correspondent at The New York Times Magazine.

In 2022, Leibovich joined The Atlantic as a staff writer.

Broadcasting 
Leibovich appears frequently as a guest on MSNBC’s Morning Joe, NPR’s On the Media, and other public affairs programs.

Writing 
In addition to his political writing, Leibovich has also written:
 The New Imperialists, a collection of profiles of technology pioneers, published January 2002, by Prentice Hall Press.
 Citizens of the Green Room, an anthology of Leibovich’s profiles in the New York Times and Washington Post, published November 2014 by Blue Rider Press.
 Big Game: The NFL in Dangerous Times, a behind-the-scenes look at the owners and commissioner of the National Football League, published September 2018, by Penguin Books.

This Town 
Leibovich is the author of This Town: Two Parties and a Funeral – Plus, Plenty of Valet Parking! – in America's Gilded Capital. The book debuted at No. 1 on the New York Times nonfiction bestseller list in July 2013, and remained on the list for 12 weeks. Leibovich discussed This Town on The Daily Show with Jon Stewart, ABC's This Week with George Stephanopoulos, Charlie Rose, PBS's Moyers and Company and NPR's Weekend Edition. He also appeared as a contestant on NPR’s Wait, Wait Don’t Tell Me. In a February 2014 edition of Jeopardy!, This Town was the answer to a clue in the category “2013 Bestsellers.”

In advance of its July 2013 release, Politico published an article describing This Town as a "chronicle" of the "incestuous ecology of insider Washington". Leibovich, according to the story, is nicknamed "Leibo," and the book's original sub-title was "The Way it Works in Suck Up City".
Fareed Zakaria as reviewer for the Washington Post praises it as the "hottest political book of the summer", containing " juicy anecdotes" and a tell-tale core of "corruption and dysfunction". Richard McGregor of the Financial Times described Leibovich as "like a modern-day Balzac".

In his book review for The New York Times, novelist Christopher Buckley described This Town as a series of “mini-masterpieces of politico-anthropological sociology". The Economist said This Town "may be the most pitiless examination of America’s permanent political class that has ever been conducted".

This Town was released in paperback in April 2014 in conjunction with the annual White House Correspondents Dinner, which Leibovich has described as "an abomination".

The book attracted controversy when an aide to Representative Darrell Issa was fired for sharing reporters’ e-mails with Leibovich without their knowledge.

Big Game: The NFL in Dangerous Times 
Leibovich is the author of Big Game: The NFL in Dangerous Times. The book looks at a 4-year period in the NFL where Mark follows the most powerful people in the NFL, including commissioner Roger Goodell, quarterback Tom Brady, and Dallas Cowboys owner Jerry Jones. The book also looks at the controversies surrounding the NFL such as the long-term health hazards, football's impact on concussion and brain health, and how politics have crossed into the sport.

Awards and recognition
Leibovich has won a number of journalism awards, including a 2011 National Magazine Award for his profile of Politico's Michael Allen and the changing media culture of Washington. The New Republic described Leibovich as “brutally incisive yet not without pathos” in naming him one of Washington's 25 Most Powerful, Least Famous People. Washingtonian Magazine has called him the "reigning master of the political profile”  and The Atlantic’s Jeffrey Goldberg nominated Leibovich as Washington’s "most important journalist"  for his "ability to make his profile subjects look like rock stars, on the one hand, and to make others look like complete idiots, on the other".

Personal life 
Leibovich lives in Washington D.C. with his wife and three daughters.

Works 
Leibovich, Mark (2002). The New Imperialists: How Five Restless Kids Grew Up To Virtually Rule Your World. New Jersey: Prentice Hall Press. 
Leibovich, Mark (2013) This Town: Two Parties and a Funeral-Plus, Plenty of Valet Parking!-in America's Gilded Capital. New York: Blue Rider Press. 
Leibovich, Mark (2014) Citizens of the Green Room: Profiles in Courage and Self-Delusion. New York: Blue Rider Press. 
Leibovich, Mark (2018) Big Game: The NFL in Dangerous Times. Penguin Press. 
Leibovich, Mark (2022) Thank You for Your Servitude: Donald Trump's Washington and the Price of Submission. Penguin Press.

References

External links

 
 Mark Leibovich at The New York Times
 

Jewish American journalists
American male journalists
American people of Argentine-Jewish descent
The New York Times writers
Living people
1965 births
University of Michigan College of Literature, Science, and the Arts alumni
Newton South High School alumni
21st-century American Jews